Pedro Arévalos, O.S.H. (died 1572) was a Roman Catholic prelate who served as Bishop of Cartagena (1571–1572).

Biography
Pedro Arévalos was born in Spain and ordained a priest in the Order of Saint Jerome.
On 8 May 1571, he was appointed during the papacy of Pope Pius V as Bishop of Cartagena.
He served as Bishop of Cartagena until his death in 1572.

References

External links
 (for Chronology of Bishops) 
 (for Chronology of Bishops) 

16th-century Roman Catholic bishops in New Granada
Bishops appointed by Pope Pius V
Roman Catholic bishops of Cartagena in Colombia
1572 deaths
Hieronymite bishops